This is a list of people elected Fellow of the Royal Society in 1938.

Royal Fellow 

Henry William Frederick Albert Duke of Gloucester

Fellows 

Guy Dunstan Bengough
Charles Herbert Best
William Brown
Sir James Wilfred Cook
Thomas Lydwell Eckersley
George Ingle Finch
William Ewart Gye
Sir William Vallance Douglas Hodge
Sir Julian Sorell Huxley
John Jackson
Sir Robert Ludwig Mond
James Ernest Richey
Sir Frederick Stratten Russell
Sir Basil Ferdinand Jamieson Schonland
Frank Sturdy Sinnatt
Kenneth Manley Smith
Edgar Stedman
Cecil Edgar Tilley
William Ernest Stephen Turner
Herbert Henry Woollard

Foreign members

John Jacob Abel
Niels Erik Norlund

Statute 12  fellows 
Arthur Neville Chamberlain

1938
1938 in science
1938 in the United Kingdom